The 24th Satellite Awards is an award ceremony honoring the year's outstanding performers, films and television shows, presented by the International Press Academy.

The nominations were announced on December 3, 2019. The winners were announced on December 19, 2019.

Special achievement awards
Auteur Award (for singular vision and unique artistic control over the elements of production) – Edward Norton (Motherless Brooklyn)

Humanitarian Award (for making a difference in the lives of those in the artistic community and beyond) – Mounia Meddour (Papicha)

Mary Pickford Award (for outstanding contribution to the entertainment industry) – Stacy Keach

Nikola Tesla Award (for visionary achievement in filmmaking technology) – Joe Letteri

Best First Feature – Laure de Clermont-Tonnerre (The Mustang)

Stunt Performance Award – Steve Stafford

Ensemble: Motion Picture – Knives Out

Ensemble: Television – Succession

Motion picture winners and nominees

Winners are listed first and highlighted in bold.

Films with multiple nominations

Films with multiple wins

Television winners and nominees

Winners are listed first and highlighted in bold.

Series with multiple nominations

Series with multiple wins

References

External links
 International Press Academy website

Satellite Awards ceremonies
2019 film awards
2019 television awards